Maol Ruanaidh mac Ruaidhrí Ó Dubhda, Chief of the Name and Lord of Tireragh, died c. 1450.

Almost the only document dealing with the succession as the Ó Dubhda chief of the name is Araile do fhlathaibh Ua nDubhda, which presents many chronological difficulties. Even when dates and/or lengths of reigns are given, they can only be appromiximated as some chiefs may have ruled in opposition to each other. 

Araile stated that Maol Ruanaidh ruled for 18 years and that "The daughter of Mac Goisdeilbh" (Costello) "was his mother. In the year 1432 this man was made Ó Dubhda."

References
 Araile do fhlathaibh Ua nDubhda/Some of the princes of Ui Dhubhda, pp. 676–681, Leabhar na nGenealach:The Great Book of Irish Genealogies, Dubhaltach Mac Fhirbhisigh (died 1671), eag. Nollaig Ó Muraíle, 2004–05, De Burca, Dublin.

External links
 Ucc.ie

Medieval Gaels from Ireland
People from County Mayo
People from County Sligo
15th-century Irish people
Irish lords